Joe James Weatherley (born 19 January 1997) is an English professional cricketer, who plays for Hampshire County Cricket Club. Weatherley, who has represented and captained England at under 19 level, is a right-handed batsman and off spinner. He made his first-class cricket debut for Hampshire against Cardiff MCCU in April 2016, going on to make his List A and Twenty20 debuts for the club later in the same season. He left KES (Southampton) in 2015.

During the 2015–16 and 2016–17 English off-seasons Weatherley played Adelaide Grade cricket for Woodville, making a career-best score of 220 in January 2017 for the team. On 14 March 2017, Weatherley signed on loan for Kent for the 2017 season. He made his debut for the county in their opening County Championship match of 2017 against Gloucestershire at Canterbury in April.

In April 2022, he was bought by the Southern Brave for the 2022 season of The Hundred.

References

External links

1997 births
Living people
English cricketers
Hampshire cricketers
Cricketers from Winchester
Kent cricketers